Stanislav Sergeyevich Tarasyuk (born 5 January 1987) is a Russian former professional football player.

Club career
He played two seasons in the Russian Football National League for FC Vityaz Podolsk and FC Petrotrest Saint Petersburg.

External links
 

1987 births
Living people
Russian footballers
Association football defenders
FC Zenit-2 Saint Petersburg players
FC Vityaz Podolsk players
FC Petrotrest players
FC Tosno players
FC Neftekhimik Nizhnekamsk players